Flynn is an open-source platform as a service (PaaS) claiming it supports everything that can run on Linux. Its goal is "to free everyone from operating software, that is all  tasks humans currently do to run server side applications." The creators are trying to distinguish Flynn from competitors by using a modular structure. Flynn can be run on a local machine, in the cloud or on a server. It supports twelve-factor apps.

History 
In July 2013, Flynn started a crowdfunding campaign that generated over $75,000, the campaign was self-run. After a development period of nine months, Flynn released its first preview release. By the time of August 13, 2014, Flynn was in beta. This beta-release also shipped as a single repository for the first time. Flynn then focused on stability of the service and held a feature freeze until its first production stability stable candidate, meaning no new features would be added until then, with the exception of the appliance framework. On February 24, 2015, a gamma version was released. The gamma's release most notable changes compared to the beta release are the addition of overlay networking, secure updates, volume management with ZFS, an integration test suite, router, service discovery and example apps. By this time Flynn also announced that they raised over a million US dollars from investors. On November 4, 2015, the launch of the stable release channel for Flynn was announced. Three years after the start of the project, on July 26, 2016, Flynn announced the release of Flynn 1.0. This is the first version to allegedly be stable enough for production use. On September 21, 2016, Managed Flynn, also called "Ops as a service", was announced as a service in addition to their at that time already existing commercial support and training products.

Architecture  
Flynn is built mostly in Go. JSON over HTTP is used for both internal and external communication. Flynn uses Ubuntu 16.04 LTS amd64 as their base operating system. Apps can be deployed either by Docker containers or as Heroku buildpacks, Flynn has built-in support for both methods so no additional installs are needed.

Limitations 
Flynn doesn't make use of some of the more recent app-delivery techniques. Kubernetes, for instance, isn't used in Flynn because it didn't exist when Flynn was created. Flynn instead has its own scheduler. Two reasons why Kubernetes support hasn't been implemented are the effort required to do so and its future direction. However, Jonathan Rudenberg, co-founder of Flynn, reported that "..., it's possible that doing that change will make sense at some point in the future".

Another limitation is that database support is limited to small-scale production workloads. Flynn's documentation states that the databases are not currently stable for storing large amounts of data. Their goal is to make them usable for all use cases, including high volume, large dataset workloads.

References

External links 
 Official website

Linux software